Hérard Abraham (28 July 1940 – 24 August 2022) was a Haitian military officer and politician who served as the acting President of Haiti in 1990, helping to lead its democratic transition.

Biography

Hérard Abraham was born in Port-au-Prince on 28 July 1940. He enlisted in the Haitian army as a young man and rose to the rank of lieutenant general. Abraham became one of the few military members in the inner circle of President Jean-Claude Duvalier. He supported the 1986 coup against him. Under Henri Namphy, he served as the Secretary of State for the Interior and National Defense from 7 February to 24 March 1986, the Minister of Information and Coordination from 24 March 1986 to January 1987 and Minister of Foreign Affairs from 20 June to 18 September 1988.

He became acting President of Haiti on 10 March 1990 after street protests forced President Prosper Avril into exile. He gave up power three days later, becoming the only military leader in Haiti during the twentieth century to give up power voluntarily. Abraham helped in securing the 1990–91 Haitian general election. In January 1991, he helped to crush a coup attempt by Roger Lafontant. In July 1991, he was forced to retire from the army by the recently elected President Jean-Bertrand Aristide and moved to the United States. He settled in Miami, Florida and drifted into obscurity.

After the 2004 Haitian coup d'état forced Aristide to resign, Abraham was one of the contenders for the position of the Prime Minister of Haiti. His friend Gérard Latortue however was chosen at the end by the Council of Sages and he appointed Abraham as a minister in his cabinet. Abraham was sworn in as the Minister of Interior and National Security on 17 March 2004. He later served as the Minister of Foreign Affairs from 28 January 2005 to 9 June 2006.

On 7 October 2019, amid nationwide protests for the resignation of Haitian President Jovenel Moise, the retired lieutenant general penned an open letter regretting the situation. He called on political leaders to show thoughtfulness and patience for a resolution so that the country could never again be called a "shit hole", referring to language attributed to U.S. President Donald Trump.

In 2020, President Jovenel Moïse appointed Abraham to a five-member committee for drafting a new Constitution of Haiti. He started suffering from a brain tumor before his death and died at the age of 82 on 24 August 2022 at his home in Fermathe.

References

1940 births
2022 deaths
Presidents of Haiti
Haitian Interior Ministers
Foreign Ministers of Haiti
Haitian military personnel
1980s in Haiti
1990s in Haiti
2000s in Haiti
20th-century Haitian politicians
21st-century Haitian politicians
Haitian expatriates in the United States
People from Port-au-Prince